Maybrook is a village in Orange County, New York, United States. The population was 3,150 at the 2020 census. It is part of the Poughkeepsie–Newburgh–Middletown, NY Metropolitan Statistical Area as well as the larger New York–Newark–Bridgeport, NY-NJ-CT-PA Combined Statistical Area.

It is located mostly in the town of Montgomery, but a small portion is in the town of Hamptonburgh. It is also defined by the 427 telephone exchange in the 845 area code and the 12543 ZIP code, as well as its own eponymous fire district.

Geography
Maybrook is located at  (41.486660, -74.214463).

The village is centered on NY 208, which runs through it for the village's two-mile (3.2 km) length in a northeast–southwest orientation, from the small extension in the Town of Hamptonburgh to its northern boundary. By contrast, it is only one mile wide at its widest point, near its south end, and even narrower to the north.

The village is mostly flat, rising up to hills on its western side. Maybrook's lowest point is a swampy, undeveloped area in iterns northeast corner,  in elevation.

Stewart Dairy Farm
In 1930 Thomas "Archie" Stewart, an early aviation enthusiast and descendant of prominent local dairy farmer Lachlan Stewart, convinced his uncle Samuel Stewart to donate "Stoney Lonesome", split between the towns of Newburgh and New Windsor, to the nearby city of Newburgh for use as an airport.

In the early 1970s, Governor Nelson Rockefeller's administration saw the potential for Stewart Airport to support the metropolitan area. Its long runway made it particularly attractive for intercontinental service via supersonic transport (SST), then under development in the U.S. and elsewhere.  The Metropolitan Transportation Authority was the first government body to try to convert it into the New York metropolitan area's fourth major airport. It tripled the airport's territory, extending its land well beyond its previous western boundary at Drury Lane, a two-lane rural road. The state government used its eminent domain powers to take 7,500 acres (30 km2) for terminals, runways and a buffer zone expanding the airport from Newburgh into neighboring towns of Montgomery and a small portion of Hamptonburgh. The land was bounded by I-84 to the north, Route 207 along the south and roughly by Rock Tavern and Maybrook in the west.

Demographics

As of the census of 2000, there were 3,084 people, 1,043 households, and 780 families residing in the village. The population density was 2,306.3 people per square mile (888.6/km2). There were 1,077 housing units at an average density of 805.4 per square mile (310.3/km2). The racial makeup of the village was 82.81% white, 8.98% African American, .29% Native American, 1.2% Asian, 3.99% from other races, and 2.72% from two or more races. Hispanic or Latino of any race were 12.74% of the population.

There were 1,043 households, out of which 46.3% had children under the age of 18 living with them, 54.3% were married couples living together, 14.7% had a female householder with no husband present, and 25.2% were non-families. 19.9% of all households were made up of individuals, and 7.1% had someone living alone who was 65 years of age or older. The average household size was 2.95 and the average family size was 3.41.

In the village, the population was spread out, with 32.7% under the age of 18, 8.2% from 18 to 24, 32.8% from 25 to 44, 19.0% from 45 to 64, and 7.4% who were 65 years of age or older. The median age was 32 years. For every 100 females, there were 95.2 males. For every 100 females age 18 and over, there were 92.7 males.

The median income for a household in the village was $52,872, and the median income for a family was $56,912. Males had a median income of $40,165 versus $30,385 for females. The per capita income for the village was $19,194. About 3.6% of families and 6.1% of the population were below the poverty line, including 6.9% of those under age 18 and 11.2% of those age 65 or over.

History
The hamlet was not incorporated as a village until 1926, making it the last of the town of Montgomery's three villages to be created. Its growth was spurred by the development of Maybrook Yard, an important railroad switching terminal where eastbound traffic from several railroads was funneled across the Poughkeepsie Bridge. At its peak, the yard employed over 1,500 workers. All yards, terminals and roundhouses have since been removed following the closing of the Poughkeepsie Bridge in 1974. There remains freight service to Maybrook via the Middletown and New Jersey Railroad.

Transportation
Maybrook is accessible by Interstate 84, the New York State Thruway and Stewart International Airport. New York State Route 208 is the main north–south road through the center of the village. Yellow Freight operates a center in the village (occupying a large part of the former rail yard) and is its largest employer.

Campbell Hall station, on the Metro-North Railroad's Port Jervis Line, is 5.4 miles to the southwest. The  station on the Hudson Line is 20 miles to the east.

See also

List of villages in New York

References

External links

Village website

Villages in New York (state)
Villages in Orange County, New York
Populated places established in 1926
Poughkeepsie–Newburgh–Middletown metropolitan area